Wanderers Cricket Ground is a cricket ground in Windhoek, Namibia. The first recorded match on the ground was in 1990 when Namibia played the Netherlands.

The ground held its first List A match in the 2001/02 6 Nations Challenge when Namibia played Sri Lanka A. In 2004, the ground held its first first-class match between Namibia and Uganda in the 2004 Intercontinental Cup. The first Twenty20 match was played on the ground in 2010, between Namibia and Bermuda, with the ground holding a further Twenty20 match between Namibia and Uganda later in 2010.

In April 2013, the ground hosted its first ever international T20 match between Kenya and Netherlands.

International Records

One-Day International five-wicket hauls
The following table summarizes the five-wicket hauls taken in ODIs at this venue.

References

External links
 Wanderers Cricket Ground, Windhoek at CricketArchive
 Wanderers Cricket Ground, Windhoek at cricinfo

Cricket grounds in Namibia
Buildings and structures in Windhoek
Sport in Windhoek